Curby is an unincorporated community in Jennings Township, Crawford County, Indiana. It is a populated place that is not incorporated and has no legal boundaries.

History
A post office was established at Curby in 1904, and remained in operation until it was discontinued in 1915. The community was named after the maiden name of the wife of an early settler.

Geography

References

Unincorporated communities in Crawford County, Indiana
Unincorporated communities in Indiana
1904 establishments in Indiana
Populated places established in 1904